This list of tallest buildings in Mississauga refers to the tallest buildings in the City of Mississauga, Ontario, Canada. Mississauga is a city in Southern Ontario located in the Regional Municipality of Peel, and in the western part of the Greater Toronto Area. With a population of 721,599 as of the Canada 2016 Census, it is Canada's sixth-most populous municipality, and has almost doubled in population in each of the last two decades, leading to a series of massive and ongoing construction booms which continue to drastically alter the city's skyline. Mississauga is now the third most populous city on the Great Lakes, surpassing the cities proper of Detroit, Milwaukee and Cleveland over the last two decades.

Developed as a suburb of Toronto, Mississauga's growth is attributed to its proximity to that city. However, Mississauga's extensive corporate and industrial employment opportunities differentiate it from suburban bedroom communities. The city has also been trying to create a distinctive image for itself over the past few years.

By 2023, there will be 4 skyscrapers surpassing 170m. The tallest would be M3, a proposed building, which would stand at about 260 m, with 81 stories. Upon completion, it would be the tallest building outside of Toronto in Ontario.

Tallest Buildings
This list ranks buildings in Mississauga that stand at least 100 m (328 ft) tall, based on CTBUH height measurement standards. This includes spires and architectural details but does not include antenna masts.

Approved and Under Construction
There are 13 buildings approved and under construction buildings in Mississauga that are planned to rise at least 100 m (328 ft) as of October 2020.

Structures, all time

See also

 List of tallest buildings in Canada
 List of tallest structures in Canada
 List of tallest buildings in Ontario
 List of tallest buildings in Toronto
 List of tallest buildings in London, Ontario
 List of tallest buildings in Hamilton, Ontario
 Canadian architecture

References

 
Mississauga
Tallest buildings in Mississauga